Giulio Cacciandra (15 July 1884 – 28 January 1971) was an Italian horse rider who competed in the 1920 Summer Olympics. In 1920 he and his horse Facetto won the silver medal in the team eventing after finishing 14th in the individual eventing competition. He also won the bronze with his horse Fortunello in the team jumping event.

References

External links 
 profile

1884 births
1971 deaths
Italian event riders
Italian show jumping riders
Olympic equestrians of Italy
Italian male equestrians
Equestrians at the 1920 Summer Olympics
Olympic silver medalists for Italy
Olympic bronze medalists for Italy
Olympic medalists in equestrian
Medalists at the 1920 Summer Olympics